Dr William McRae FRSE CIE (26 May 1878 – 8 July 1952) was a Scottish botanist specialising in fungi and lichens. He is largely remembered for his extensive work in India.

Life
He was born on 26 May 1878 to his mother Margaret Younie and father William McRae. His family lived at 90 Princes Street in Edinburgh. He was educated at James Gillespie's High School in Edinburgh, then studied science at the University of Edinburgh before studying as a postgraduate at the University of Munich in Germany.

He worked as a Demonstrator in the Royal College of Science, London, then in 1908 moved to India. His first job was with the Indian Agricultural Service and then he moved to the Imperial Agricultural Research Institute in Madras with the title of Government Mycologist. He later became Director of the Institute.

In 1934 he was awarded a Commander of the Order of the Indian Empire (CIE). In 1936 he was elected a Fellow of the Royal Society of Edinburgh. His proposers were Malcolm Wilson, Sir William Wright Smith, Robert Campbell, and John Macqueen Cowan.

He retired to Edinburgh with his wife and family and died there on 8 July 1952.

References

1878 births
1952 deaths
Scientists from Edinburgh
People educated at James Gillespie's High School
Civil servants from Edinburgh
Fellows of the Royal Society of Edinburgh
Scottish botanists
Scottish mycologists
Companions of the Order of the Indian Empire
Ludwig Maximilian University of Munich alumni
British people in colonial India